Aureisphaera galaxeae is a Gram-negative, strictly aerobic and heterotrophic bacterium from the genus of Aureisphaera which has been isolated from the coral Galaxea fascicularis from Akajima.

References 

Flavobacteria
Bacteria described in 2015